Naumburg is a town in the district of Kassel, in Hesse, Germany. It is located 25 km southwest of Kassel on the German Timber-Frame Road.

References

External links
 Official Webpage

Kassel (district)

uz:Naumburg